This article involves the historical statistics of the National Games of China.

Host cities

List of the National Games 

Notes:

OE: Official events.
DE: Demonstration events.

All-time medal table

Medal count

References

Sports records and statistics